Edward Fitch (born April 29, 1937 in Roxboro, North Carolina) is an occult author and a High Priest of the Gardnerian Wicca tradition, and was a leading figure in the rise of contemporary Wicca and Neo-Paganism in America. He presently lives in Austin, Texas.

Military service and education
Fitch was a graduate of Virginia Military Institute, and a United States Air Force commissioned officer, eventually retiring with the rank of lieutenant colonel. He holds a master's degree in Systems Management from the University of Southern California. His military service took him to Japan, Viet Nam, Thailand, and several posts in the United States. After completing his three-year term of service, he returned to the US as a civilian, and took employment as a technical writer and electronics engineer in Washington D.C. He returned to the Air Force in 1966 and remained in the service, working in missile design and deep-space planning studies until retiring.

Influence in Neo-Paganism
Fitch, who has also gone under the name "Ea", was initiated by Raymond Buckland in 1967, while stationed in Hanscom Air Force Base in Massachusetts. He is one of the creators (along with Joseph Bearwalker Wilson and Thomas Giles) of "The Pagan Way", an outer court Neo-Pagan tradition. He was one of the editors of  The Waxing Moon, a magazine founded by Joseph B. Wilson in 1964, and the first magazine devoted to Witchcraft in America (later renamed The Crystal Well). In the mid 1970s, Fitch also helped to organize and chaired two Pagan Ecumenical Councils to establish the Covenant of the Goddess (COG) as an international umbrella organization representing Pagans. Through the 1980s Fitch continued to perform as a Gardnerian High Priest, but his researches also led him to initiation in a number of other traditions and orders, including: Faerie faith, Mohsian, the Order of Osiris, the Order of the Temple of Astarte, Norse, and Ceremonial magick.

Other activities
Besides being the author of several books on magic and Neo-Pagan topics, his employment over the years has included being a technical writer and electronics engineer in Washington D.C., working as a private detective, as a shopkeeper at Disneyland, California, as an editor for a small publishing house, and as a trouble-shooter for the Federal Aviation Administration (FAA) in Washington DC, before returning to the aerospace industry in California in 1997.

Bibliography
 Castle of Deception: A Novel of Sorcery and Swords and Other-Worldly Matters, With Seven Short Essays on the Reality of Matters Supernatural (1983) Llewellyn Publications 
 A Grimoire of Shadows: Witchcraft, Paganism, & Magick (2002) Llewellyn Publications 
 Magical Rites from the Crystal Well (1984) Llewellyn Publications 
 The Outer Court Book of Shadows
 Rites of Odin (2002) Llewellyn Publications 
 The Rituals of the Pagan Way: A Book of Pagan Rituals (with Joseph B. Wilson and Thomas Giles)

References
 Roberts, Susan (1971) Witches, U.S.A.  Dell
 Adler, Margot (1979) Drawing Down the Moon: Witches, Druids, Goddess-Worshippers, and Other Pagans in America Today. Beacon Press, 1979; revised and updated 1997. Penguin (Non-Classics) 
 Grimassi, Raven (2000) Encyclopedia of Wicca & Witchcraft. Llewellyn Publications 
 Rosemary Ellen Guiley (1989) The Encyclopedia of Witches & Witchcraft Facts on File 
 Lewis, James & Shelley Rabinovitch (2003) The Encyclopedia of Modern Witchcraft & Neo-Paganism. Citadel Press

External links
 Ed Fitch: Revealing the Craft by Sylvana SilverWitch
 

1937 births
Living people
American occult writers
American Wiccans
Wiccan writers
Wiccan priests